Thérèse Brulé was a former French athlete who specialized in the high jump.  Her sister Jeanne assumed the General Secretariat of the Fédération des sociétés féminines sportives de France (FSFSF) in 1920.

Historical  
Thérèse Brulé, typist by trade, was with her sister Jeanne and the other sisters Liébrard one of the founders, on 27 July 1912, of Femina Sport, which included Mrs. Faivre Bouvot as the first president.  During the great War, they strove to improve gender codes of the day which confined the activities of women  in rhythmic gymnastics and athletic sports. This club then established itself as the bastion of sportif feminism, of which Germaine Delapierre, graduate in philosophy, and Alice Milliat were the main organisers.  At their instigation the office Fédération des sociétés féminines sportives de France(FSFSF) became exclusively female in 1920 and Therese's sister Jeanne becomes on the General Secretary.

Sporting career  
A versatile sportswomen, Therese Brule participated in July 1917 in the first female French Athletic Championships at the stadium of the porte Brancion in Paris. In 1921 she participated at the 1921 Women's Olympiad in Monaco and also in the runners-up 1922 Women's Olympiad and 1923 Women's Olympiad.

Performances 
On the occasion of the championships, she establishes French athletic records in 4 events:
  Standing high jump: 0,96 m,   
 Running High jump:  1.25 m (tied with Mlle  Mireux d'En Avant)   
 80 meters flat: 12.4 s   
 400 meters flat   : 1 min 16.2 s   
 In 1920 she again won the high jump with leap of 1.33 m.   
 With her sister Jeanne, she also takes part in the world record of the 10 × 100 m replay,  in the time of 2 min 23.2 s in 1921.

References  

French female high jumpers
French female sprinters
Year of birth missing
Year of death missing
Women's World Games medalists